The Environment, Food and Rural Affairs Select Committee is a select committee of the House of Commons in the Parliament of the United Kingdom. The remit of the Committee is to examine the expenditure, administration and policy of the Department for Environment, Food and Rural Affairs and its associated public bodies.

Membership
On 28 January 2020, Neil Parish was confirmed as the Committee's Chair-elect. Parish resigned as MP on 30 April 2022, following accusations of watching pornography in the House of Commons. Parish's resignation from the House of Commons became effective on 4 May 2022.  

Geraint Davies served as interim Chair until the election of Robert Goodwill as new committee Chairman. As of 25 May 2022, the members are as follows:

Changes 2019-present

2017-2019 Parliament
The chair was elected on 12 July 2017, with the members of the committee being announced on 11 September 2017.

Changes 2017-2019

2015-2017 Parliament
The chair was elected on 18 June 2015, with members being announced on 8 July 2015.

Changes 2015-2017

2010-2015 Parliament
The chair was elected on 10 June 2010, with members being announced on 12 July 2010.

Changes 2010-2015

See also
Parliamentary Committees of the United Kingdom
Department for Environment, Food and Rural Affairs

References

External links
Environment, Food and Rural Affairs Committee
Records for this Committee are held at the Parliamentary Archives

Select Committees of the British House of Commons